The Admiralty Yard Craft Service was the civilian service which operated auxiliary vessels for the British Admiralty, mainly in HM Dockyards or the vicinity. It was renamed the Port Auxiliary Service (PAS) on 1 October 1958 and the Royal Maritime Auxiliary Service in 1976

The service operated tugs, harbour ferries, launches, and lighters. Although some of its tugs were classified as ocean-going, it did not operate ocean-going supply vessels, which were the responsibility of the Royal Fleet Auxiliary. The Yard Craft Service crews answered to the Captain's Department in each dockyard.

The Fleet Coaling Service and the Admiralty Dredging Service were separate, but closely related, services. Ratings and engineers often transferred freely between vessels of the three services, although masters and mates had to be rated individually on each of the three types of vessel. The Fleet Coaling Service, renamed the Fleet Fuelling Service sometime between 1914 and 1926, operated harbour and coastal vessels carrying coal and fuel oil to Royal Navy vessels. Its masters did not have to be so highly qualified as the masters of the other two services and were paid considerably lower salaries. The Dredging Service was originally part of the Admiralty Works Department, but later transferred to the Civil Engineer-in-Chief's Department (between 1914 and 1926). By 1947, the other two services had fully amalgamated into the Yard Craft Service.

Vessels of the Service flew the Blue Ensign defaced by the yellow Admiralty anchor badge.

Ranks/Ratings
Rated in ascending order of pay scales.

1914
Boy
Ordinary Seaman
Dredger Deckhand
Harbourman
Able Seaman/Dredger Fireman/Dredger Stoker/Dredger Ladderman
Writer/Messenger
Stoker/Skilled Harbourman
Coaling Master 2nd Class/Leading Stoker/Dredger Engine Driver
Chief Stoker/Leading Harbourman
Mate
Coaling Master 1st Class
Engineer 3rd Class
Master 2nd Class/Dredger Master/Suction Dredger Navigator/Engineer 2nd Class
Master 1st Class
Engineer 1st Class
Suction Dredger Master and Chief Engineer

1926
Boy
Stoker 2nd Class
Ordinary Seaman
Harbourman/Dredger Deckhand
Writer Messenger
Able Seaman
Dredger Stoker/Dredger Fireman/Dredger Ladderman
Stoker 1st Class/Skilled Harbourman
Wireless Telegraph Operator
Leading Stoker
Dredger Engine Driver
Coaling Master 2nd Class
Leading Harbourman
Mate
Chief Stoker
Tug Mate
Coaling Master 1st Class
Engineer 3rd Class
Master 2nd Class/Dredger Master/Suction Dredger Navigator/Engineer 2nd Class
Coaling Master C1
Master 1st Class
Engineer 1st Class
Suction Dredger Master and Chief Engineer

In 1925, all Masters (except Coaling Masters), Mates, and Engineers 1st and 2nd Class were authorised to wear uniforms.

1947

In 1947, there was a reorganisation.

The grades of Harbourmen and Writer Messengers were abolished, with Harbourmen being transferred to corresponding Seaman or Stoker grades.
Coaling Masters were renamed Coaling Supervisors.
Engineers 3rd Class were renamed Mechanicians.
Boatswains were introduced as third-in-command of larger tugs, second-in-command of vessels with no Mates, or in charge of certain smaller vessels.
All Masters, Mates, Engineers and Coaling Supervisors C1 became salaried and were officially classed as officers.

From 1947, the non-salaried grades were as follows:

Boy
Ordinary Seaman/Stoker 2nd Class
Able Seaman/Stoker 1st Class/Dredger Deckhand/Dredger Fireman
Dredger Deckhand (Winch Driver)
Dredger Ladderman
Leading Stoker/Coaling Supervisor Class 2/Wireless Telegraph Operator
Leading Seaman
Dredger Crane Driver/Dredger Grab Driver
Boatswain/Chief Stoker/Qualified Wireless Telegraph Operator
Mechanician/Coaling Supervisor Class 1

These grades were still extant in 1962.

1970
By 1970 the grades were:

Seaman Apprentice
Ordinary Seaman/Mechanic 2nd Class
Able Seaman/Mechanic 1st Class
Able Seaman Special
Leading Seaman/Leading Stoker/Fuelling Supervisor 2nd Class
Chief Stoker/Fuelling Supervisor 1st Class
Boatswain/Mechanician

Footnotes

References
Statement of the Decisions of the Lords Commissioners of the Admiralty on the Petitions received from the Civilian Employees in HM Dockyards and Naval Establishments at Home in 1914
Admiralty, Conditions of Service, Rates of Pay, Allowances etc. of the Ratings Serving in the Yard Craft at HM Dockyards, Victualling Yards etc. at Home, December 1926
Admiralty Fleet Order (AFO) 2/62, 5 January 1962

Royal Navy